Anastasini Circus (Italian: Circo Anastasini) is an Italian entertainment company founded in 1877 by Lugi Biasini, Girolamo Biasini, Sidonia, and Antonia. . It is currently one of the oldest circus around. The Anastasini circus was an Italian travelling circus. The circus moved to the United States in 1980 when Renato and his family went to perform with Circus Vargas, the country's largest traveling circus under canvas at that time.

The circus is currently in its 9th generation.

Acts
Pound Puppies - Luciano Anastasini and Gladis España
Risley Act - Anastasini Brothers, Giuliano & Fabio Anastasini
Aerial Rotating Cradle - Giovanni Anastasini & Irene España
Anastasini Diabolos

Anastasini Family Circus
1st Generation - Luigi Biasini, Girolamo Biasini, Sidonia, Antonia
2nd Generation -
3rd Generation -
4th Generation -
5th Generation -
6th Generation -
7th Generation - Renato Anastasini, Betty Anastasini, Orlanda Anastasini, Luciano Anastasini
8th Generation - Giovanni Anastasini & Irene España, Luciano Anastasini & Gladis España
9th Generation - Giuliano Anastasini, Fabio Anastasini, Brando Anastasini, Adriano Anastasini, Chiara Anastasini,

References 

Entertainment companies of Italy
Circuses
Buskers
Italian companies established in 1877